The Ferrari F1/86 was the car with which Scuderia Ferrari competed in the 1986 Formula One World Championship. The car was designed by Harvey Postlethwaite, who had also designed its predecessor, the 156/85. It was driven by Italian Michele Alboreto and Swede Stefan Johansson. The car was very uncompetitive, despite the engine being regarded as one of the strongest on the grid.

Development and race history
The chassis and the overall design of the 1986 car was very similar to the 1985 model. The main concerns were in refining the aerodynamics and improving reliability.

Although it was among the fastest cars in a straight line in the 1986 season, often bettered only by the BMW powered cars, the F1/86 performed far worse than its predecessor: the reliability problems were all but eliminated, but it was constantly outpaced by the faster Williams-Hondas, McLaren-TAGs, Lotus-Renaults and Benetton-BMWs. The car gained 5 podiums during the year, 4 from Stefan Johansson and 1 from Michele Alboreto, and failed to score a single win, pole position or fastest lap. 

Powered by the Tipo 032, the F1/86 is the most powerful car, for racing or road, that Ferrari has ever produced. However, the car's handling problems became apparent in the corners following the straight with Mansell claiming they were driving much slower than he could have despite Alboreto being on a qualifying lap (Alboreto qualified six-tenths slower than Mansell). The F1/86 reportedly only handled well on the smoothest of circuits, such as Paul Ricard - the smoothest of all F1 circuits at the time. 

The car did manage to lead one lap of the entire 1986 season at the Belgian Grand Prix when Johansson inherited the lead from Mansell, who had made an early pit stop for new tyres (Johansson finished 3rd in front of team leader Alboreto despite being told via the radio to stay behind the Italian). The F1/86 looked to be at its most competitive during the Italian Grand Prix where Alboreto was keeping pressure on the Williams' of Nigel Mansell and Nelson Piquet, before a spin exiting the Variante del Rettifilo chicane. Alboreto had already overtaken Keke Rosberg (McLaren), René Arnoux (Ligier-Renault) and Gerhard Berger (Benetton) and looked on course to compete for victory.

Ferrari recruited English designer John Barnard, then technical director at McLaren, towards the latter stages of the season in an attempt to regain ground on their rivals from 1987 onwards. The chassis was replaced by the Gustav Brunner designed F1/87 model for the 1987 season. 1986 was also the last year for Ferraris 120° V6 turbo used by the team since . For 1987 the team introduced an all new 90° V6 turbo dubbed the Tipo 033.

Complete Formula One results 
(key)

References 

F1 86
1986 Formula One season cars